Andrea is a given name which is common worldwide for both males and females, cognate to Andreas, Andrej and Andrew.

Origin of the name 

The name derives from the Greek word ἀνήρ (anēr), genitive ἀνδρός (andrós), that refers to man as opposed to woman (whereas man in the sense of human being is ἄνθρωπος, ánthropos). The original male Greek name, Andréas, represents the hypocoristic, with endearment functions, of male Greek names composed with the andr- prefix, like Androgeos (man of the earth), Androcles (man of glory), Andronikos (man of victory).

In the year 2006, it was the third most popular name in Italy with 3.1% of newborns. It is one of the Italian male names ending in a, with others being Elia (Elias), Enea (Aeneas), Luca (Lucas), Mattia (Matthias), Nicola (Nicholas), Tobia (Tobias). In recent and past times it has also been used on occasion as a female name in Italy and in Spain, where it is considered the legitimate feminine form of Andrés/Andreo/Andreu (Andrew). Outside of Italy, the name is generally considered a female name.

Usage 

 In Czech, Slovak, Polish, Slovenian, Dutch, English, French, German, Hungarian, Scandinavian languages and Spanish, Andrea is a feminine name. Masculine forms are Andrej, Ondřej, Andrzej, Anže, Andrew, Andreas, András, Andreo, Andrés, Anders, Andries or Andre.
 In Albanian Andrea is a masculine name; its native form is Ndrea.
 In Romansh Andrea is also a masculine name.
 In Italian, Andrea is a primarily masculine name.
 In Bulgarian Andrea (Андреа) is used as the feminine form of "Andrei".
 In Croatia, Serbia and Slovenia, Andrea is a feminine name; Andreja can be used as female name, while Andrija, Andro and Andrej are masculine forms. The only exception is Istria, where Andrea is a male name.
 In Romania Andreea is a feminine name and it is written with an extra "e". However, the feminine variation Andrea is also used. Andrea as etymon means knitting needle in Romanian. Andrei is the masculine form.
 Andréia is the most common Portuguese spelling of this name, although Andréa is also used in Brazilian Portuguese. The masculine form is André.
 In Dutch, Andrea is used as a female name, although the variant Andrée is found in French.
 In Spanish, Andrea and a variation spelled Andressa are used as female variants for Andreo and Andrés. 
 In Basque, Andrea and Andere exist as female names. Two etymons merge in the former: the most widespread form with a Greek root, 'man', and the Basque-Aquitanian ancient form "andere(a)", present-day "andere(a)" and "andre(a)", 'madam', 'lady' (used mainly as title, e.g. "Andramari", 'Lady/Virgin Mary'), as opposed to "jaun", 'lord'. In popular usage it can ultimately mean 'adult woman'.
 In Catalan, Andrea is used as the feminine form of "Andreu".

Notable people

Women 
 Andrea Alföldi (born 1964), Hungarian race walker
 Andrea Allan (born 1946), American actress
 Andrea Anders (born 1975), American actress
 Andrea Arlington, American model, television personality, and life coach
 Andrea Armstrong (born 1982), former American collegiate basketball player
 Andrea Ávila (born 1970), Argentine long and triple jumper
 Andrea Baker, American actress
 Andrea Bang, Canadian actress
 Andrea Barber (born 1976), American actress
 Andrea Barthwell (born 1953), American federal civil servant and Illinois political hopeful
 Andrea Berg (born 1966), German singer 
 Andrea Berg (born 1981), German volleyball player
 Andrea Berger (born 1970), American tennis player
 Andrea Borrell (born 1963), Cuban basketball player
 Andrea Bowen (born 1990), American actress
 Andrea Brown (R&B singer) (born 1974), American singer
 Andrea Brillantes (born 2003), Filipina actress
 Andrea Canning (born 1972), Canadian-American broadcast journalist
 Andrea Češková (born 1971), Czech MEP
 Andrea Corr (born 1974), Irish musician
 Andrea del Boca, (born 1965) Argentine actress
 Andrea Demetriades (born 1983), Australian actress
 Andrea Demirović (born 1985), Montenegrin singer
 Andrea Dewar (born 1979), Canadian water polo player
 Andrea Donaldson, Canada theatre director
 Andrea Dworkin (1946–2005), American radical feminist and writer
 Andrea Echeverri (born 1965), Colombian singer and guitarist, lead singer of the rock band Aterciopelados
 Andreea Ehritt-Vanc (born 1973), Romanian tennis player
 Andrea Farkas (born 1969), Hungarian handball goalkeeper
 Andrea Feldman (1948–1972), American actress
 Andrea Fioroni (born 1969), Argentine field hockey player
 Andrea Fischer (born 1960), German politician
 Andrea Ghez (born 1965), American astronomer
 Andrea Glass (born 1976), German tennis player
 Andrea Gibson (born 1975), spoken word artist and activist
 Andrea Gyarmati (born 1954), Hungarian swimmer
 Andrea Hall (born 1947), American soap opera actress
 Andrea Hayes (born 1969), American backstroke swimmer
 Andréa Henriques (born 1980), Brazilian water polo player
 Andrea Hlaváčková (born 1986), Czech tennis player
 Andrea van den Hurk (born 1979), Dutch tennis player
 Andrea Immer Robinson (born 1964), Master Sommelier and Dean of Wine Studies at the French Culinary Institute
 Andrea Jaeger (born 1965), American former tennis player
 Andrea Jeremiah (born 1985), Indian Tamil playback singer, film actress and a model.
 A. J. Cook (born 1978), Canadian actress
 Andrea Jung (born 1959), business executive
 Andrea Jürgens (1967–2017), German singer
 Andrea Kevichüsa (born 2001), Indian model and actress
 Andrea King (1919–2003), American actress
 Andrea Kobetić (born 1985), Croatian handball player
 Andrea Koevska (born 2000), Macedonian singer and Eurovision Song Contest 2022 entrant
 Andrea Komšić (born 1996), Croatian alpine skier
 Andrea Koppel (born 1963), American news correspondent
 Andrea Leeds (1914–1984), American actress
 Andrea Lehotská (born 1981), Slovak television hostess, actress, and top model.
 Andrea Lekić (born 1987), Serbian handball player
 Andrea Levy (1956–2019), British author
 Andrea Lewis (born 1985), Canadian actress
 Andrea Libman (born 1984), Canadian Voice Actress
 Andrea Lowe (born 1975), British actress
 Andrea Martin (born 1947), actress and comedian
 Andrea Mayr (born 1979), Austrian long-distance runner
 Andrea McArdle (born 1963), American singer and actress
 Andrea Mitchell (born 1946), American news correspondent
 Andrea Moody (born 1978), Canadian swimmer
 Andrea Murez (born 1992), Israeli-American Olympic swimmer for Israel
 Andrea Newman (1938–2019), British author
 Andrea Olsen (born 1961), American politician
 Andrea Petkovic (born 1987), German tennis player
 Andreea Răducan (born 1983), Romanian gymnast
 Andrea Rau (born 1947), German actress
 Andrea Riseborough (born 1981), English actress
 Andrea Russett (born 1996), American actress
 Andrea Růžičková (born 1984), Slovak actress and model
 Andrea Romano (born 1955), American voice actress
 Andrea Sanke, American television journalist and presenter
 Andrea Shaw (born 1983), American professional bodybuilder
 Andrea Stuart (born 1962), Barbadian-British historian and writer
 Andrea Suárez (born 1979), Thai singer
 Andrea Temesvári (born 1966), Hungarian former tennis player
 Andrea Thompson (born 1960), American actress
 Andrea Torres (born 1990), Filipina actress and model
 Andrea Tóth (born 1980), Hungarian water polo player
 Andrea True (born 1943), porn actress and singer
 Andrea Valderrama (born 1989), American politician
 Andrea Wilkens (born 1984), German footballer
 Andrea Yates (born 1964), American defendant in a notorious filicide case
 Andrea Zollo (born 1975), American singer
 Andrea Zonn (born 1969), American singer and musician
 Andrea Zsadon (born 1946), Hungarian soprano
 Andrea (born 1987), Bulgarian singer

Men 

 Andrea Aguyar (died 1849), Uruguayan slave turned soldier and revolutionary
 Andrea Alciato (1492–1550), Italian jurist
 Andrea Amati (1505–1577), luthier from Cremona, Italy, credited with making the first instruments of the violin family that are in the form we use today
 Andrea Antico (c. 1480 – c. 1538) was an Istrian music printer, editor, publisher and composer of the Renaissance
 Andrea Aleksi (1425–1505), Albanian architect
 Andrea Ammonio (c. 1478–1517), Italian poet
 Andrea Andreani (1540–1623), Italian engraver on wood
 Andrea Appiani (1754–1817), Italian painter
 Andrea Argoli (1570–1657), Italian mathematician and astronomer
 Andrea Aromatico (born 1966), Italian historian and expert in Hermetic iconography
 Andrea Bacci (born 1972), Italian race car driver
 Andrea Baldini (born 1985), Italian fencer
 Andrea Bargnani (born 1985), Italian basketball player
 Andrea Barzagli (born 1981), Italian football player
 Andrea Belli (1703–1772), Maltese architect
 Andrea Bianchi (born 1925), Italian film director
 Andrea Boattini (born 1969), Italian astronomer
 Andrea Bocelli (born 1958), Italian singer, writer and music producer
 Andrea Bogdani (1600–1683), Albanian prelate and scholar
 Andrea Bonomi (1923–2003), Italian footballer
 Andrea Briosco (c. 1470–1532), Italian sculptor and architect
 Andrea Camilleri (born 1925), Italian writer
 Andrea Casiraghi (born 1984), eldest child of Princess Caroline of Monaco
 Andrea Cesalpino (1519–1603), Italian physician, philosopher and botanist
 Andrea Cinciarini (born 1986), Italian basketball player
 Andrea Cordero Lanza di Montezemolo (born 1925), Archbishop of Tuscania
 Andrea Costa (1851–1913), Italian socialist activist
 Andrea Debono (1821–1871), Maltese trader and explorer
 Andrea Doria (1466–1560), Genoese condottiere and admiral. 
 He was the protonym for the ocean liner SS Andrea Doria, which famously sank in 1956, as well as four Italian warships.
 Andrea Dovizioso (born 1986), Italian motorcycle racer
 Andrea Ferrara, 16th century Scottish artificer who introduced the manufacture of the high-quality steel blades bearing his name
 Andrea Figallo (born 1972), Italian composer and conductor
 Andrea da Firenze (?-1415), Italian composer
 Andrea del Sarto (1486–1530), Italian painter
 Andrea del Verrocchio (c. 1435–1488), Florentine sculptor
 Andrea diSessa (born 1947), American academic and epistemologist
 Andrea Gabrieli (c. 1532/33-1585), Italian composer
 Andrea Gioannetti (1722–1800), Italian Roman Catholic bishop and cardinal
 Andrea Iannone (born 1989), Italian MotoGP driver
 Andrea Kim Taegŏn (1821–1846), first Korean Catholic priest, Patron Saint of Korea for the Catholic Church
 Andrea Luchesi (1741–1801), Italian composer
 Andrea Mantegna (c. 1431–1506), Florentine painter
 Andrea Massena (1758–1817), French military commander of Sardinian origin during the Revolutionary and Napoleonic Wars, one of the original eighteen Marshals of the Empire created by Napoleon
 Andrea Nuciforo (1964), US politician who served as Democratic State Senator (1997–2007)
 Andrea Orcagna (c. 1308–1368), Florentine painter, sculptor and architect
 Andrea Palladio (1508–1580), Italian architect
 Andrea Pazienza (1956–1988), Italian comics artist
 Andrea Pirlo (born 1979), Italian football player
 Andrea Pisano (c. 1270–1348), Italian sculptor and architect
 Andrea Prader (1919–2001), renowned Swiss scientist and physician, co-discoverer of the Prader-Willi syndrome
 Andrea Prosperetti (born 1944), Italian physicist, member of the U.S. National Academy of Engineering
 Andrea Renzullo (born 1996), German singer
 Andrea Sansovino (c. 1467–1529), Italian sculptor
 Andrea Meldolla (1510/1515–1563), also known as Andrea Schiavone or Andrija Medulic, was a Dalmatian Renaissance painter and etcher
 Andrea Solari (c. 1460–1524), Renaissance painter
 Andrea Tacquet (1612–1660), Flemish mathematician and Jesuit priest whose work prepared the ground for the eventual discovery of the calculus
 Andrea Tafi (fl. 1300–1325), Italian artist
 Andrea Vassallo (1856–1928), Maltese architect
 Andrea Vavassori (born 1995), Italian tennis player
 Andrea Vesalius (1514–1564), Flemish physician, author of influential books on human anatomy and often referred to as the founder of modern human anatomy
 Andrea Viterbi (born 1935), birthname of Italian-American scientist and engineer Andrew Viterbi, winner of the National Medal of Science
 Andrea Zanzotto (1921–2011), Italian poet

Fictional characters
 Andrea, a fictional character from the Daria
 Andrea Cantillo, a fictional character from Breaking Bad
 Andrea Davenport, a fictional character from The Ghost and Molly McGee
 Andrea Marino, a fictional character from Ghost Whisperer
 Andrea "Andy" McNally, a fictional character from Rookie Blue

References

Sources 
 
 

Scandinavian feminine given names
English feminine given names
German feminine given names
Serbian feminine given names
Spanish feminine given names
Italian unisex given names
Unisex given names
Given names of Greek language origin
French feminine given names
Hungarian feminine given names
Czech feminine given names
Polish feminine given names